Krzysztof Chamiec (2 February 1930 – 11 October 2001) was a Polish actor. He appeared in more than 45 films and television shows between 1962 and 2001.

Selected filmography
 Panienka z okienka (1964)
 The First Day of Freedom (1964)
 Walkover (1965)
 Zamach stanu (1981)

References

External links

1930 births
2001 deaths
Polish male film actors